William H. Howe (April 11, 1837 - April 23, 1907) was an American soldier and Medal of Honor recipient who served in  the Union Amy during the American Civil War.

Biography 
Howe was born in Haverhill, Massachusetts on April 11, 1837. He served as Sergeant and eventually a First Lieutenant in Company K of the 29th Massachusetts Volunteer Infantry Regiment. He earned his medal on March 25, 1865, at the Battle of Fort Stedman, Virginia. His medal was issued on March 8, 1895. He died on April 23, 1907, in Everett, Massachusetts and is now interred in Woodlawn Cemetery, Everett.

Medal of Honor Citation 
Served an abandoned gun under heavy fire.

References 

United States Army Medal of Honor recipients
American Civil War recipients of the Medal of Honor
1837 births
1907 deaths